MVS is an IBM mainframe computer operating system, commonly known as Multiple Virtual Storage. The acronym MVS may also refer to:

 Maritime Volunteer Service A UK Charity supplying Maritime Training and Support
 Marquez Valdes-Scantling, NFL wide receiver
 Metal vapor synthesis a technique in chemistry
 Mezinárodní všeodborový svaz, a Czechoslovak trade union federation
 Microsoft Visual Studio
 Minimum variance set - the set of attainable investment portfolios which minimise risk
 Ministry of Internal Affairs of Ukraine (Ministerstvo Vnutrishnikh Sprav - )
 Mobile Video Streaming
 Mobile Visual Search
 Mucuri Airport, in Buenos Aires (IATA code MVS)
 MultiVersus, a 2022 crossover fighting game with characters from Warner Bros. Discovery properties
 MVS Comunicaciones, a Mexican media company
 Neo Geo MVS arcade game system from SNK